The Hotel Gerard, currently known as aka Times Square, is a historic hotel located in New York, New York. It had also operated at the Hotel Langwell and Hotel 1-2-3. The building was designed by George Keister and built in 1893. It is a 13-story, "U"-shaped, salmon colored brick and limestone building with German Renaissance style design elements. The front facade features bowed pairs of bay windows from the third to the sixth floor and the building is topped by steeply pointed front gables and a highly decorated dormer. It was originally built as an apartment hotel.

The hotel is located at 123 West 44th Street, next door to the Belasco Theatre.

It was added to the National Register of Historic Places on February 10, 1983.

See also
National Register of Historic Places listings in Manhattan from 14th to 59th Streets
List of New York City Designated Landmarks in Manhattan from 14th to 59th Streets

References

Hotel buildings on the National Register of Historic Places in Manhattan
Renaissance Revival architecture in New York City
Hotel buildings completed in 1893
Hotels in Manhattan
New York City Designated Landmarks in Manhattan
Midtown Manhattan